Zećira Mušović (born 26 May 1996) is a Swedish professional footballer who plays as a goalkeeper for Women's Super League club Chelsea and the Sweden national team.

Early life
Mušović's family are from Prijepolje, Serbia. Her three older siblings were born in the town but the family emigrated due to the Yugoslav Wars. The family eventually settled in Sweden. Mušović was born in Falun and brought up in Scania. She is proud of her Bosniak heritage and takes annual vacations to Bosnia and Herzegovina, visiting relatives and her "favourite city" Sarajevo.

Club career
Mušović began playing football for Stattena IF as a nine-year-old. She spent two seasons with the club's senior women's team in Division 2 in 2011 and 2012, helping the club secure promotion in the latter campaign.

She transferred from Stattena to LdB FC Malmö in October 2012. In 2013 she understudied Þóra Björg Helgadóttir, who was named Goalkeeper of the Year as Malmö secured the 2013 Damallsvenskan championship. Malmö rebranded as FC Rosengård for the 2014 Damallsvenskan and Mušović was elevated to first team contention when Helgadóttir left the club during the mid-season break.

German import Kathrin Längert then vied with Mušović for Rosengård's goalkeeper position. When Mušović secured increasing first team participation in the 2015 Damallsvenskan, the club announced they were pleased with her development and awarded a new 2.5-year contract in May 2015. Ambitious Mušović wanted to become the best goalkeeper in the world.

Mušović received two setbacks ahead of the 2016 Damallsvenskan season. First Rosengård signed Canadian goalkeeper Erin McLeod, then Mušović broke her arm while playing for Sweden U-23s. In the event McLeod suffered an anterior cruciate ligament injury, so the club had to bring in veteran Sofia Lundgren as cover.

After some long conversations with Rosengård director of football Therese Sjögran, Mušović agreed to remain at the club although she was unhappy at losing her place in the team once McLeod recovered from her injured knee. Instead of making a transfer request, she resolved to improve aspects of her own game by training alongside her experienced Canadian rival.

In October 2017 Mušović was given a new three-year contract by Rosengård. She declared: "FC Rosengård has always been and will always be the club in my heart". McLeod's lucrative contract was not extended, causing her team-mate and then wife Ella Masar to quit the club in solidarity.

International career
Mušović captained Sweden under-19s to the 2015 UEFA Women's Under-19 Championship final stage in Israel. She was disappointed when FC Rosengård stopped her attending the tournament because they needed her for club fixtures. The disappointment was compounded when Sweden under-19s won the competition.

Despite having lost her position as first choice at club level, Mušović was called up by incoming Sweden national team coach Peter Gerhardsson for the opening 2019 FIFA Women's World Cup qualifiers. She attended several matches as a non-playing substitute, then proudly won her first senior cap in March 2018, securing a debut "clean sheet" in a 3–0 win over Russia at the 2018 Algarve Cup.

Mušović endured a difficult second appearance for Sweden, when she deputised for Hedvig Lindahl in a friendly against Italy in October 2018. Her handling error allowed Daniela Sabatino to score the only goal of the match. In May 2019 she was one of three goalkeepers selected by Sweden for the 2019 FIFA Women's World Cup, alongside Lindahl and the uncapped Jennifer Falk.

Career statistics

International

Personal life
Mušović is in a relationship with Swedish professional ice hockey player Alen Bibić. In 2018 Mušović graduated with a degree in economics from Lund University. Her older brother Huso Mušović was himself a lower division footballer.

Mušović maintains a personal blog at her own website. She has firm political views and challenged two of her social media contacts over their support for the controversial Sweden Democrats party at the 2018 Swedish general election.

Honours

Club
FC Rosengård
Winner
 Damallsvenskan: 
 Winners (3): 2013, 2014, 2015
 Runners-up (2): 2016, 2017
 Svenska Cupen:
 Winners (3): 2016, 2017, 2018
 Runners-up (1): 2015
Svenska Supercupen:
 Winners (2): 2015, 2016
Chelsea
Winner
 FA Women's Super League: 2020–21, 2021–22
 FA Women's League Cup: 2020–21
 Vitality Women's FA Cup: 2021-22

National team
Sweden
Winner
 Algarve Cup (2): 2018, 2022

References

External links

 
  (archive)
 
 
 
 Profile at soccerdonna.de 

1996 births
Living people
Swedish women's footballers
Sweden women's international footballers
Chelsea F.C. Women players
FC Rosengård players
Damallsvenskan players
Stattena IF players
Women's association football goalkeepers
2019 FIFA Women's World Cup players
Swedish people of Serbian descent
Footballers at the 2020 Summer Olympics
Olympic footballers of Sweden
People from Falun
Swedish people of Bosniak descent
Olympic medalists in football
Medalists at the 2020 Summer Olympics
Olympic silver medalists for Sweden
Sportspeople from Dalarna County
UEFA Women's Euro 2022 players